Charles Rigon Matos (born 19 June 1996), simply known as Charles, is a Brazilian professional footballer who plays as a midfielder for Danish Superliga club Midtjylland.

Club career

Early career
Born in Santiago, Charles graduated from the youth academy of Santo Ângelo and was promoted to the senior team in 2015. He started the season as an attacking midfielder and later switched to the right back position.

Internacional
On 11 June 2015, Charles moved to Internacional and was assigned to the youth team. In 2016, while playing for Internacional B, he won the Copa FGF.

On 1 February 2017, Charles made his senior debut by coming on as a 39th minute substitute for Anselmo in a 2–1 win against Brasil de Pelotas, in Primeira Liga. Seven days later, he scored his first goal for the club in a 1–0 victory against Fluminense, in the same competition.

On 2 March 2017, Charles' contract was extended until 2020.

Sport Recife (loan)
On 16 January 2019, Charles was loaned out to Sport Recife on a one-year contract.

Ceará
Ceará confirmed on 31 December 2019, that they had acquired 50% of Charles' rights for 3 million R$, where the remaining 50% belonged to Internacional.

Midtjylland
In June 2021, Charles signed a five-year contract with Danish Superliga runners-up Midtjylland. Upon signing with the club, he stated that the presence of other Brazilian players in the club – including Paulinho, Evander and Júnior Brumado – created comfort in his choice, as well as the prospect of playing in European competitions. He made his debut for Midtjylland on 24 July 2021, on the second matchday of the 2021–22 season in a game against AaB, coming on as a substitute for Mikael Anderson as Midtjylland won 1–0.

Career statistics

References

External links
Profile at the FC Midtjylland website

Ceará official profile 

1996 births
Living people
Sportspeople from Rio Grande do Sul
Association football midfielders
Brazilian footballers
Brazilian expatriate footballers
Campeonato Brasileiro Série A players
Campeonato Brasileiro Série B players
Danish Superliga players
Associação Esportiva e Recreativa Santo Ângelo players
Sport Club Internacional players
Sport Club do Recife players
Ceará Sporting Club players
FC Midtjylland players
Expatriate men's footballers in Denmark
Brazilian expatriate sportspeople in Denmark